Samanala Sandhwaniya (සමනල සංධ්වනිය ), also known as Butterfly Symphony is a 2013 Romantic film directed by Jayantha Chandrasiri and starring Yashoda Wimaladharma, Uddika Premarathna, Pubudu Chathuranga, Wilson Gunaratne, Soorya Dayaruwan, Buddhadasa Vithanarachchi, Roger Seneviratne and Chathurika Peiris.

It was released on 4 October 2013 on EAP theaters. The film successfully completed 100 days in theatres.

Plot

Cast 
 Yashoda Wimaladharma as Punya Dissanayake
 Uddika Premarathna as Vadisha Wikramanayaka
 Soorya Dayaruwan as Young Vadisha Wicramanayaka
 Pubudu Chathuranga as Vadisha's elder brother
 Wilson Gunaratne as Danny - Vadisha's Manager
 Buddhadasa Vithanarachchi as Vadisha's father
 Roger Seneviratne as Revatha Dissanayake
 Chathurika Peiris as Vadisha's wife
 Damitha Abeyratne as Punya's roommate
 Roshan Pilapitiya 
 Rebeka Nirmali as Vadisha's sister-in-law

Soundtrack

References

External links
 Samanala Sandhwaniya on IMDB

Romantic musical films
2013 films
2010s romantic musical films